The 1989 Prudential-Bache Securities Classic was a men's tennis tournament played on outdoor hard courts in Orlando, Florida, United States that was part of the Super Series of the 1989 Grand Prix circuit. It was the fifth  edition of the tournament and took place from October 2 through October 8, 1989. Second-seeded Andre Agassi won the singles title and earned $59,500 first-prize money.

Finals

Singles
 Andre Agassi defeated  Brad Gilbert 6–2, 6–1
 It was Agassi's 1st singles title of the year and the 8th of his career.

Doubles
 Scott Davis /  Tim Pawsat defeated  Ken Flach /  Robert Seguso 7–5, 5–7, 6–4

References

External links
 ITF tournament edition details

Prudential-Bache Securities Classic